is a Japanese professional footballer who plays as a midfielder for  club Kashima Antlers.

Career
Higuchi began his career with Sagan Tosu where he played for three seasons, scoring eight goals in 78 appearances for the club.
In December 2021, he transferred to Kashima Antlers. Higuchi enjoyed a strong first season representing Kashima, playing 42 games for the club across all competitions and finishing with the 8 league assists, the second highest amount for the season. He finished the season with 13 assists in total.

Career statistics

References

External links

Profile at Kashima Antlers

1996 births
Living people
Japanese footballers
Association football midfielders
Sagan Tosu players
Kashima Antlers players
J1 League players